Oscar Vai To'elau Kightley  (born 14 September 1969) is a Samoan-born New Zealand actor, television presenter, writer, journalist, director, and comedian. He acted in and co-wrote the successful 2006 film Sione's Wedding.

Biography
Kightley was born in 1969 in Apia, Samoa, the youngest of eight children, and was raised in his father's village of Faleatiu. He came to New Zealand after the death of his father, when he was 4 years old and was adopted by his aunt and uncle, who lived in West Auckland. He attended Rutherford College, where writing was his favourite subject.

After leaving school, Kightley was a cadet at the Auckland Star, and worked as a journalist for four years. "I thought that was going to be me until I retired." He moved to Christchurch in 1991 to be a presenter for the children's television show Life in the Fridge Exists (L.I.F.E), where he met Tanya and Mishelle Muagututi'a, Erolia Ifopo, and Simon Small.

Professional career
Small had written his first full-length play, Horizons, about the Samoan experience in New Zealand, and invited Kightley to perform in it in his first acting role, along with Muagututi'a and Ifopo. Horizons opened the Performing Arts Theatre on 19 October 1991 in a production directed by Christina Stachurski. The play was re-workshopped and recast (but still with Kightley) and in August–September it played at Galaxy Theatre in Auckland, Taki Rua Depot, and the Castle Theatre at the University of Otago before returning to Christchurch.

The success of Horizons inspired Kightley to form Pacific Underground theatre company in Christchurch alongside Small, Muagututi'a, Ifopo, and Michael Hodgson, a mixture of people from palagi and Pacific Island identities. In just two months Kightley and Small (who wrote as Francis Serra) had written the play Fresh off the Boat. The play was workshopped by Playmarket, and directed by Nathaniel Lees with David Fane as the lead. The play opened at the Rolleston Ave Theatre in Christchurch in November 1993, toured to the New Zealand Fringe Festival in Wellington in 1994, and also played for three weeks at Downstage in 1995. It later went to Auckland, Apia, and Brisbane. It won a Media Peace Award and was published in 2005.

As well as Pacific Underground, Kightley co-founded the Island Players theatre company. He won the Bruce Mason Playwriting Award in 1998 and has worked as a performer and writer for a number of television shows including Skitz, Telly Laughs, The Panel, Sportzah, and TV3's rugby coverage. His plays include Dawn Raids, Island Girls, A Frigate Bird Sings (co-written with Dave Fane and Nathaniel Lees), and Niu Sila (co-written with Dave Armstrong). Dawn Raids was reissued in 2018 by Playmarket. Kightley also co-wrote and took a lead role in the highly successful Sione’s Wedding movies.

He was a breakfast announcer on Niu FM until January 2007. He has also been on RNZ National/Te Reo Irirangi o Aotearoa National as a guest, as well as guest-hosting Kim Hill's Saturday Morning show during Summer 2007–2008. In 2006 he received a Laureate Award from the Arts Foundation of New Zealand. He is a member of the comedy group the Naked Samoans, who together wrote the animated television series bro'Town.

In 2013 Kightley played the title character in the police drama Harry, which he also co-wrote. He directed Madeleine Sami's TV3 comedy Super City, and co-directed a US pilot of it with Taika Waititi.

In 2019, Kightley led a panel for Auckland Council on why people should vote in local body elections. In 2022, Kightley was elected to the Henderson-Massey local board at the 2022 New Zealand local elections, representing the Labour Party.

Honours and awards 
In the 2009 New Year Honours, Kightley was appointed a Member of the New Zealand Order of Merit, for services to television and the theatre. In 2016, he was awarded the Senior Pacific Artist Award with Dave Fane at the Creative New Zealand Arts Pasifka Awards.

In 2019, Kightley received the Fulbright-Creative New Zealand Pacific Writer's Residency, "a unique opportunity for a New Zealand writer of Pacific heritage to work on a creative writing project exploring Pacific identify, culture, or history." The significance of this award is the place it has in the development of contemporary Maori and Pacifica culture, and of Kightley's stature within the history of that development. The Residency, located at the University of Hawaiʻi at Mānoa, was inaugurated by film director, writer, and educator Sima Urale in 2004; other film and theatre artists who have received the award include Victor Rodger (2006), Toa Fraser (2009), and Makerita Urale (2010). The University of Hawaiʻi at Mānoa is also where Merata Mita "developed [the] Academy for Creative Media’s indigenous filmmaking program.

In October 2019, Kightley was presented with a Scroll of Honour from the Variety Artists Club of New Zealand for his contribution to New Zealand entertainment.

In November 2020 he was named one of the best dressed men in show business on David Hartnell MNZM's Best Dressed List.

Filmography

References

External links

1969 births
Living people
21st-century New Zealand male actors
21st-century New Zealand dramatists and playwrights
21st-century New Zealand male writers
21st-century New Zealand politicians
New Zealand people of Samoan descent
New Zealand male film actors
New Zealand male comedians
Samoan male actors
Actors of Samoan descent
Members of the New Zealand Order of Merit
People educated at Rutherford College, Auckland
Pacific Media Network
New Zealand male dramatists and playwrights